The Military University of Radioelectronics is a Russian military academy conducting warrant officer programmes, commissioned officer programmes (specialitet), advance training career commissioned officer programmes (magistratura), and adjunctura programmes. It is located in Cherepovets.

History
The University was founded in 1957 as Cherepovets Military School of Communications. In 1970, it was renamed the Cherepovets Higher Military Command School of Communications. In 1974, it was renamed the Cherepovets Higher Military Engineering School of Radioelectronics. In 1998, the School was transformed into Cherepovets Military Engineering Institute of Radioelectronics. In 2020, it received the current name.

Educational programmes
The Military University of Radioelectronics prepares officers-specialists in radioelectronics for all military branches.

References

External links
 Official website

Military academies of Russia
Military academies of the Soviet Army
Military high schools